This is a list of phenomenologists

 Edmund Husserl
 Martin Heidegger
 Heinrich Rombach 
 Edith Stein
 Moritz Geiger
 Aron Gurwitsch
 Alfred Schütz
 Felix Kaufmann
 Roman Ingarden
 Herbert Spiegelberg
 Maurice Merleau-Ponty
 Jean-Paul Sartre
 Emmanuel Levinas
 Jacques Taminiaux
 Maurice Natanson
 Hubert Dreyfus
 Shaun Gallagher
 Dan Zahavi
 Fritz Kaufmann
 John Daniel Wild
 James M. Edie
 Karol Wojtyła
 Edward S. Casey
 Burt C. Hopkins
 Avshalom Elitzur
 Jean-Luc Marion

Bibliography

Behnke, Elisabeth A., David Carr, J. Claude Evans, José Huertas-Jourda, J. J. Kockelmans, W. Mckenna, Algis Mickunas et al. Encyclopedia of phenomenology. Vol. 18. Springer Science & Business Media, 2013.
Dreyfus, H. L. (1991). Being-in-the-world: A commentary on Heidegger's Being and Time, Division I. MIT Press.
Elitzur, A. C. (1989). Consciousness and the incompleteness of the physical explanation of behavior. The Journal of Mind and Behavior, 1–19.
Elitzur, A. C. (1995). Consciousness can no more be ignored. Journal of Consciousness Studies, 2(4), 353–357.
Elitzur, A. C. (2009). Consciousness makes a difference: A reluctant dualist’s confession.
Gallagher, S. (2012). Phenomenology. London: Palgrave Macmillan.
Gallagher, S. and Zahavi, D. (2012). The Phenomenological Mind. London: Routledge.
Gurwitsch, A. (1979). Phenomenology and Theory of Science. Northwestern University Press.
Gurwitsch, A. (1979). Studies in phenomenology and psychology. Northwestern University Press.
Husserl, E. (1999). The Idea of Phenomenology. Springer.
Husserl, E. (2012). Ideas: General Introduction to Pure Phenomenology. London: Routledge.
Merleau-Ponty, M. (1962). Phenomenology of Perception. Trans. C. Smith. London: Routledge.
Spiegelberg, H. (1965). The Phenomenological Movement (Vol. 2). The Hague, Netherlands: Martinus Nijhoff.

Phenomenologists